Anolis oporinus, the Pimienta green anole, is a species of lizard in the family Dactyloidae. The species is found in Cuba.

References

Anoles
Reptiles described in 2001
Endemic fauna of Cuba
Reptiles of Cuba
Taxa named by Orlando H. Garrido
Taxa named by Stephen Blair Hedges